The Longest Journey is a magical realist point-and-click adventure video game developed by Norwegian studio Funcom for Microsoft Windows and released in 1999.

The game was a commercial success, with sales in excess of 500,000 units by 2004, and was acclaimed by critics. An iOS version was released on October 28, 2014.

Gameplay
The Longest Journey is a point-and-click adventure game where the player interacts with objects on the screen to solve puzzles and advance the story. The game features expansive recorded dialogue, most of which is non-essential to completing the game but contributes to the setting.

Plot

The game takes place in the parallel universes of magic-dominated Arcadia and industrial Stark. The protagonist, April Ryan, is an 18-year-old art student living in Stark, identified as a 'Shifter' capable of movement between these worlds, and tasked with restoring their essential Balance.

The story begins in Stark, where a sleeping April unintentionally shifts to Arcadia and meets the 'White Dragon', who identifies her as the heroine of the coming story. Upon learning this, April is attacked by a dark 'Chaos Vortex' and awakens in Stark, where she dismisses her experience as a nightmare. The character 'Cortez' later surprises her by revealing his knowledge.

When surreal activity begins affecting her friends, April meets again with Cortez, who transports her to the Arcadian city Marcuria. There she meets Tobias Grensret, Vestrum of the Sentinel; learns Alltongue, the common language in Arcadia; and hears from Tobias that the Balance protecting both worlds is dissolving after the dereliction of its Guardian, and must be restored by the appearance of another.

To return to Stark, April visits Brian Westhouse, a friend of Cortez, who assists her return; Cortez then tells her of the organization known as the Vanguard or Church of Voltec. The next day, April consults Warren Hughes, a homeless boy who agrees to help April if she erases his criminal record and locates his missing sister, in doing which April finds a data cube on the Church of Voltec. Hughes then refers her to a hacker named Burns Flipper, who reveals that the wealthy magnate Jacob McAllen is head of the Vanguard, assisted by Gordon Halloway, a former candidate for Guardianship divided by the Vanguard into Chaos (in Arcadia) and Logic (in Stark), and gives her a false identification by which to infiltrate the Vanguard through its front company MTI.

Meeting Cortez and Father Raul in a Catholic cathedral, April is told that Arcadia is on the brink of war. Later in Arcadia, April meets the innkeeper, Benrime Salmin, and the clairvoyant Abnaxus, ambassador of the Venar, who identifies the coming danger. In the morning, April learns of four magical species, each of whom has prophecies of a savior who will restore the Balance, only to finally break it – and determines to visit one such species, the winged Alatian of the island Alais, having gained sea-travel by rescuing a talking bird that she names Crow. Before departing, she learns that she must defeat an alchemist named Roper Klacks, in order to free the ships' wind that he holds captive.

At Roper Klacks' Tower, April challenges Klacks to use his magic against her calculator, and wins. Immediately before her departure to Alais, Tobias gives April the Talisman representing the Balance. En route, April kills the monster known as 'Gribbler' while rescuing one of her captive Banda, whose species later give her the name 'April Bandu-embata' as a mark of gratitude and grant her part of the disc necessary to restore the Balance.

On the voyage to Alais, a 'Chaos Storm' attacks the ship, and April sabotages the ship's compass to restore its course. When the ship's captain seizes her Talisman, April attempts to retrieve it, and in so doing sinks the ship, whereupon the crew abandon her on a raft. She is taken prisoner by the Maerum, a Mermaid-like species related to the Alatian, but currently their enemies. In revealing their common ancestry, April fulfills a prophecy of the 'Waterstiller', a foretold savior of the Maerum.

After fulfilling the second prophecy by killing a 'Snapjaw', she is conveyed to fulfill the third by re-uniting the Maerum with the Alatians. After a series of tasks and in meeting with the Alatians' leader, April fulfills their prophecy by flying without wings, and convinces the Alatian to make peace with the Maerum.

In a coastal sea cave, the Teller's guard and the Maerum Queen bring stones which combine to form the second part of the Balance's disc; whereupon the Maerum convey April, at her own request, to the Blue Dragon, who gives April one of the disc's Jewels and takes her to a ship inhabited by the Dark People, who give April the third piece of the disc, and an astral map locating the Guardian's Realm.

At the Marcurian Harbor, April is attacked by the Chaos and returns to the Cathedral in Stark. There, Father Raul reveals that he is also a Sentinel Minstrum of Stark, and that Cortez is missing. On returning to her lodgings, April is caught by Gordon Halloway. She is rescued by another character, Lady Alvane, who teaches April to shift at will, and sends April to Abnaxus to receive the disc's final piece. April then returns to the White Dragon, who reveals herself as April's mother and dies, and a new White Dragon emerges from her egg.

Returned to Stark, April gives Flipper the star map to decipher, infiltrates MTI, and is captured by antagonist McAllen. Unable to escape, she surrenders her two jewels and the disc, and is then imprisoned. Upon escaping in pursuit of her object, she is trapped again; but rescued by Cortez. McAllen then reveals that he and Cortez are two Dragons (called 'Draic Kin', in-universe) meant to protect Stark, but at odds after McAllen's decision to re-unite the two worlds despite the risk of Chaos. The two then appear to die in combat. Retrieving the disc and the four jewels, April returns to Flipper, whom she finds dying after the seizure of her deciphered map by Gordon Halloway, and gains a copy from him, which she uses to locate the Guardian's Realm near the space station 'Morning Star'.

At the station, April frees Adrian, the derelict Guardian, and escapes with Halloway in pursuit. On her way to the Guardians' Tower, she imprisons the Chaos Vortex in her Talisman and later summons Crow, who helps her complete the necessary trials. Inside the tower, April re-unites Halloway with the Chaos Vortex to restore his candidacy as Guardian and returns to Stark and Arcadia.

In the Epilogue, the scene returns to Lady Alvane's home, where she has narrated the entire story to two youths, and where she reveals that the two worlds re-united under Gordon Halloway. Upon their departure, an aged and graying Crow enters, asking the tale of the "warrior princess" who won the war of the Balance, and she corrects his impression; a possible reference to the sequel, Dreamfall: The Longest Journey.

Development
The title of the game is a reference to the quote by the Swedish diplomat Dag Hammarskjöld: "The longest journey is the journey inward, for he who has chosen his destiny has started upon his quest for the source of his being." Other inspirations for the game included Gabriel Knight: Sins of the Fathers, Neil Gaiman's The Sandman and The Books of Magic, Hellblazer, Swamp Thing, Buffy the Vampire Slayer, and Joss Whedon's writing in general.

The Longest Journey was developed by a small internal team at Funcom led by Ragnar Tørnquist. It was their first original project. Funcom put few restrictions on the developers except the budget (approx. $2–3 million) and the deadline. Since the team had to develop the game engine and most of the required tools from scratch, they struggled to release the game on time. For most of 1999, the team had to work overtime and during weekends to ultimately meet the deadline. In the original Norwegian release, April Ryan was voiced by the journalist Synnøve Svabø.

First published by IQ Media Nordic in Norway in 1999, it was later localized for and released in France, the United Kingdom, Germany, Italy, Belgium, the Netherlands, Canada, Spain, Denmark, Finland, Sweden, Poland, Czech Republic, Russia, and the United States. The game was originally written and recorded in English, though most of the localizations were released before the English version. In October 2011, it was announced that The Longest Journey was being ported to iOS, with the article mainly focusing on the iPhone.

Release and sales
Before its release, The Longest Journey received positive preview coverage and was heavily promoted in Norway. Dagbladet described the title as "the first big Norwegian computer game." Its target demographics were outside the industry's norm: Ragnar Tørnquist reported that Funcom wanted to capture "a more adult audience in addition to the usual teenage buyers". The game's high budget meant that 150,000 sales were necessary to break even. However, Norway's market for games was small. According to Herman Berg of Digi.no, it was rare for a game's Norwegian sales to reach 10,000 units. The Longest Journeys domestic sales goal was 15,000 units, while its global lifetime goal was 300,000 units. Funcom shipped 15,000 copies of The Longest Journey to Norwegian retailers in the game's first month and a half on shelves, and publisher IQ Media noted that sell-through and store re-orders were high through late December. Sell-in had reached 10,000 units in Sweden by that time. Based on the available data, IQ's Nickolay Nickelsen noted that it "looks as if half of the players are actually girls."

According to Tørnquist, The Longest Journey experienced "solid sales across Europe" before its release in the United States. The game sold 15,000 units in Norway by May 2000, while overall European sales totaled 100,000 units by September 2000. It launched in Germany with a shipment of 40,000 units to retailers; Chris Kellner of DTP Entertainment, which handled the game's German localization, reported its lifetime sales between 10,000 and 50,000 copies in that market. In Spain, the game sold 50,000 copies after roughly one year, a commercial hit for the country. Its English release was purposely delayed to prevent imports from cannibalizing local sales across Europe.

The Longest Journey struggled to find a North American publisher. According to market research firm PC Data, North American sales of The Longest Journey reached 12,495 retail units by the end of 2000, of which 10,873 were sold in December. By January 2001, global sales of The Longest Journey totaled almost 200,000 units. PC Data reported an additional 40,160 retail sales of The Longest Journey in North America during the first six months of 2001. By that June, the game's worldwide sales had climbed to 250,000 copies, of which the United States accounted for 90,000. PC Data's estimate for the title's North American sales for January–December 2001 was 71,962 retail units, followed by another 12,044 in the first six months of 2002. By July 2002, global sales of the game had reached 450,000 copies, according to Funcom. A new shipment was released in North America that month, as its earlier printing had sold out. Ragnar Tørnquist noted in 2003 that he was "very satisfied" with The Longest Journeys sales in North America, and explained, "There was such strong word of mouth, and so many great reviews, that we managed to get TLJ into most big stores and out to the players regardless of marketing."

In May 2003, Marek Bronstring of Adventure Gamers wrote that The Longest Journey "sold half a million copies worldwide and it's still selling, making it one of the most successful adventure games in recent years." The following year, IGN reported that its sales had surpassed 500,000 units. The site's Richard Aihoshi summarized The Longest Journey as "a critical and commercial success". In 2019, Tørnquist recalled that "at least 50 per cent" of The Longest Journeys players were female, a fact that he believed increased its commercial success.

Reception

The Longest Journey was acclaimed by critics. It was praised for its female protagonist April Ryan, who is considered one of the most memorable female characters in the history of adventure games, and also for its enigmatic, complex storyline and high production values, but was criticized for some of its more obscure puzzles. It received a score of 88.00% on GameRankings and 91/100 on Metacritic. GameSpot called it "one of the best adventure games in years" and applauded the "complex and interesting story" although found the ending lacking as "the epilogue does little to wrap everything up". IGN said the game "actually reinvents how stories can be told in the medium" and noticed the mature content, including "harsh subject matter, and some big time swearing". Some of the puzzles were described as "inane", but on the whole the game "hones the genre into its tightest, sharpest form yet". The US edition of PC Gamer praised the "mature and magical" story, the "sumptuous" graphics, and the game's puzzles. The only criticism levied by the magazine was that some parts of the game might be "too edgy" for younger players.

Eric Bratcher reviewed the PC version of the game for Next Generation, rating it three stars out of five, and stated that "This is a potential epic that seems to have taken tranquilizers. It's still worthwhile, but it's also a little slow, a little dull, and sometimes just doesn't make sense."

The Longest Journey was named the best computer adventure game of 2000 by Computer Gaming World, The Electric Playground, GameSpot, IGN and PC Gamer US, and was nominated in the category by CNET Gamecenter and Computer Games Magazine. It also won IGN's "Best Game No One Played" and GameSpot's "Best Story" awards. Computer Gaming Worlds editors praised the game for offering "a mature, literate, and compelling story featuring a strong female heroine who, for once, is not exploited for her looks."

In 2011, Adventure Gamers named The Longest Journey the second-best adventure game ever released.

Sequels
A sequel to The Longest Journey began production in early 2003. The game, Dreamfall: The Longest Journey, was released in April 2006. The developers view Dreamfall: The Longest Journey as more of a spin-off than a direct sequel to the first game, as it revolves around a new protagonist, with a new storyline. 

The next installment of the series, Dreamfall Chapters, was crowd-funded on Kickstarter and was released episodically. Its first episode was released in October 2014. The last episode shipped in June 2016. 

The direct sequel to The Longest Journey, entitled The Longest Journey Home, was revealed in 2013 and is to be produced after Dreamfall Chapters. By 2016, the release of TLJHome is still under a question. Ragnar Tornquist stated that even though he wants to produce the game, there are many reasons why it may never happen.

See also
Runaway: A Road Adventure
Syberia
Escape from Monkey Island

References

External links

 
 

 
1999 video games
Funcom games
IOS games
Point-and-click adventure games
The Longest Journey games
Video games about dragons
Video games developed in Norway
Video games featuring female protagonists
Video games about parallel universes
Windows games
ScummVM-supported games
Single-player video games
Empire Interactive games
Tri Synergy games
DTP Entertainment games